The Îles de la Madeleine  lie west of Dakar in Senegal.  The islands are uninhabited.  The main island is Sarpan, known for its Stone Age tool finds.  The islands are also known for their birds, fish and plant life. The cliffs are steep, and had been carved by the sea over millions of years. Îles de la Madeleine National Park is one of the smallest national parks in the world.

Îles de la Madeleine National Park

At just , Le Parc National des Îles de la Madeleine is the smallest national park in the world, and a UNESCO World Heritage Tentative List site. 
 (Île aux Serpents), the largest of the islands, is home to breeding colonies of red-billed tropicbird, white-breasted cormorant, and bridled tern.

Tree
From this he concluded that the species was extraordinarily long-lived. When Théodore Monod searched the island in the 20th century, this tree was not to be found.

See also
List of islands of Senegal
Deux Mamelles

References

Islands of Africa
Geography of Senegal
National parks of Senegal
World Heritage Sites in Senegal
Atlantic islands of Senegal